Kevin Martin Brennan (12 September 1920 – 17 December 1998) was an Australian-born British-based film and television actor. He appeared in the children's ITV series A Bunch of Fives in the 1970s and as Doris Luke's love interest Tom Logan in the British soap opera Crossroads in 1982.

Filmography

References

External links
 
 Profile at ww2roll.gov.au

1920 births
1998 deaths
British male film actors
British male television actors
Male actors from Sydney
Australian emigrants to the United Kingdom

Australian Army personnel of World War II

20th-century British male actors
Australian Army soldiers